Pak Nam-chol may refer to:

 Pak Nam-chol (footballer, born 1985), North Korea midfielder
 Pak Nam-chol (footballer, born 1988), North Korea defender
 Pak Nam-chol (judoka) (born 1979), North Korean judoka